The Wrong Goodbye may refer to:

 "The Wrong Goodbye" (Gossip Girl), an episode of the American Television series, Gossip Girl
 "The Wrong Goodbye", an episode of the British comedy-drama series, Minder
 "The Wrong Goodbye", an episode of the British comedy-drama series, Doc Martin